Antanas Škėma (November 29, 1910 – September 11, 1961) was a Lithuanian writer, playwright, stage actor and director. His best known work is the novel Balta drobulė (White Shroud).

Life and career

Antanas Škėma was born on November 29, 1910 (according to his birth certificate in 1911) in Łódź, Poland where his father was sent to work as a teacher. During World War I he lived in Russia with his parents. In 1921 they all returned to Lithuania.

He attended high schools in Radviliškis and Kaunas. In 1929 he entered the University of Lithuania Medical faculty, but in 1931 he transferred his studies to the Faculty of Law. At that time the school was renamed as Vytautas Magnus University.

In 1935 he joined the theatre studio led by V.Sipavičius-Fedotas and was later accepted to the Lithuanian State Theatre in Kaunas. In 1936 Škėma started acting on the inter-war Lithuania's main stage.  While he was living in Kaunas he married Janina Solkeviciute, a Polish economist.  From 1940 to 1944 he worked at Vilnius State Theater, now also as a director. Škėma had parts in nearly every play of that period. His daughter, Kristina, was born in 1940 as World War II broke out and the Soviet Union occupied Lithuania.

Škėma briefly participated in the anti-Soviet uprising during the German occupation in 1941. In 1944, upon the second Soviet occupation of Lithuania, he left for Germany, where he was involved in some artistic work with Lithuanian troupes, primarily in DP (displaced person) camps. It was also there that his first book, a collection of short stories Firebrands and Sparks (Nuodėguliai ir kibirkštys), was published.

In 1949 Škėma left Europe for United States. He did menial work for a living and eagerly participated in the cultural activities of the Lithuanian exiles. He took part in the Chicago Theatre and Boston's Drama Group performances, staged his own plays. Further short stories, dramas and the novel Balta drobulė were published.

In 1960–1961 he worked in the editorial office of Vienybė newspaper. In addition, he was lecturing, debating and writing articles on theatre and literature for various publications.

Antanas Škėma died in a car accident in Pennsylvania on September 11, 1961.

Literary work
Škėma's best-known novel, Balta drobulė (1958), aroused vivid literary discussions. Most reviewers considered it an interesting creative experiment that attempted to lead the Lithuanian fiction down an untrodden path. The novel follows an exiled Lithuanian poet named Antanas Garšva who, like Škėma himself, works as an elevator operator in New York. The author examines alienation, trauma and creativity through the character of Garšva and his tragic experiences that ultimately lead to madness. While the immediate action lasts little more than a day, through the memories the story covers Garšva's whole life from early childhood, via the inter-war period, the occupations and refugee camps in Europe to the new life in the US. The novel is partly autobiographical.

Antanas Škėma uses the innovative (for Lithuanian literature) stream of consciousness narrative to great effect, creating entirely his own style. The novel is defined by irony, occasional surrealism, unexpected metaphor, acute stylistic contrasts where lyrical and aesthetically delicate confessions suddenly give way to coarse, cynical images, and a broad spectrum of intertextual cultural allusions. On the technical level, the author often plays with the sounds of words, disengaging phonemes from their literal meaning, and also expresses the cultural clash through the Americanization of language.

Originally printed by an emigré Lithuanian publishing house in London as Nida Book Club series edition (Nidos Knygų Klubo leidinys. no. 23.), Balta drobulė was released in Lithuania in 1990. Since then, it has been translated and published in Estonian (1992), Latvian (2000), English (2017), as White Shroud, and German (2017), as Das weiße Leintuch.

His short story Izaokas (Isaak) was made into a major motion picture of the same name in 2019.

References

External links
Short story "Steps and Stairs"
The English translation of "White Shroud"
The German translation of "White Shroud" ("Das weiße Leintuch")

1910 births
1961 deaths
20th-century dramatists and playwrights
20th-century Lithuanian male actors
20th-century novelists
Lithuanian dramatists and playwrights
Lithuanian emigrants to the United States
Lithuanian male stage actors
Lithuanian male writers
Lithuanian novelists
Road incident deaths in Pennsylvania
Vytautas Magnus University alumni